Stella Maris College is an independent Roman Catholic high school for girls, located  on the northern end of Manly Beach in Manly, on the Northern Beaches of Sydney, New South Wales, Australia. Founded in 1931 by the Sisters of the Good Samaritan, the College provides a religious and general education in the Benedictine tradition for approximately 950 girls from Year 7 to Year 12 from the surrounding area and from overseas. Stella Maris is a day school so international students board with homestay families in the local area. In recent years governance of the College has passed to Good Samaritan Education, established by the Sisters for the continued canonical oversight of all the Congregation's schools.

History

In 1857 Archbishop Polding founded the first Australian order of nuns, the Sisters of the Good Samaritan of the Order of St Benedict. The sisters had been looking for a home to look after the growing number of orphaned and neglected children, and in 1880 they heard of a good-sized estate at Manly, then unoccupied and in disrepair. It proved an ideal spot and in 1881 was blessed as the Star of the Sea Convent and the Good Samaritan Sisters moved in and set up a school for them.

The sisters taught the usual school subjects up to the age of 14, then trained the girls in skills that would enable them to earn a living – mostly sewing and laundry. In 1886 the Parramatta orphanage, owned by the government but run by the Sisters of the Good Samaritan, was closed and the Sisters at Manly took in additional charges. In the very early years the Sisters also conducted a small day school for neighbourhood children and a boarding school ‘for high class ladies’ on the site.

In 1910 the orphans were moved to other more rural sites due to the development of Manly, principally to what is now Mater Dei Special School in Camden, and the Sisters took over the running of St Mary's school in Whistler Street.

In 1930 the original house was demolished and the present-day Convent and single-storey school were built and the College re-opened the following year with an intake of thirty-three pupils from Kindergarten to Intermediate Certificate, and was a co-educational primary school and a girls’ high school. The primary school was gradually phased out and by 1944 Stella Maris was purely a high school for girls.

The last Good Samaritan Principal left the school at the end of 1995, and in 1997 the Convent was handed over for College use.

Since then there have been a number of extensions and developments to accommodate the approximately nine hundred and fifty students who study there today.

In 2004 new buildings were opened comprising a theatre, dance studio, drama studio, fitness centre, music practice rooms, and new classrooms. In 2012 the new Benedict Campus opened on Pittwater Road, and in 2018 the Scholastica building comprising Science laboratories, a new library and staff work space was opened.

List of Principals

 Sr Sabina Shinnick (1931-1934)
 Sr Joseph Fanning (1935-1940)
 Sr Dolores Carroll (1941-1944)
 Sr Colombiere Connors (1945-1947)
 Sr Luigi Walker (1948-1949)
 Sr Colette Egan (1950-1954)
 Sr Sheila Murphy (1955-1964)
 Sr Hermenegild Johnson (1965-1969)
 Sr Philomena Gallagher (1970-1975)
 Sr Consilio (Noela) Bunn (1976-1981)
 Sr Marcella (Marilyn) Kelleher (1982-1993)
 Sr Lia Van Haren (1994-1995)
 Allan Coman (1996-2005)
 Kerry Stirling (2006-2008)
 Mary Ryland (2009) (Acting)
 Vicki Comerford (2010-2014)
 Elizabeth Carnegie (2015- )

Extra-curricular activities

Activities include:
 Dance Company and Ensembles
 Da Vinci Decathlon, Maths Olympiad and other external competitions
 Drama Ensembles
 Debating
 Duke of Edinburgh International Award
 Music bands, choirs, ensembles at every skill level
 Spectra Science Club, Art Club, Book Club and a range of other clubs
 Alpha Youth Group, Writers' Group
 Diverse team and individual sports at all levels of representation from inter-school to National and International

Social Justice

The College supports the charitable works of the Good Samaritan Sisters in Kiribati, the Bacalod Kinder School in the Philippines, Mater Dei School in Narellan, the Melbourne Women's Shelter and Santa Teresa Mission in Central Australia. Students raise funds, donations in kind or volunteer for LifeLine, Bear Cottage, the Northern Beaches Women's Shelter, Pink Hope (a charity started by a former Stella student about breast cancer education and fundraising), St Kieran's GIFT Cook Off, Legacy, St Vincent de Paul Society, Mike Pawley's Happy Days Village school in Cambodia, an SCR Group clothing collection and Caritas Australia's Project Compassion.

House system

Prior to 2013 students belonged to one of four Houses: Rosaria (Green), Carmel (Blue), Fatima (red) and Lourdes (yellow). The Houses were so-named as a reference to the fervent Marian devotion of the Sisters. As the student body grew in number, the decision was made that from 2014 the number of Houses would be increased, making the Houses more manageable for the student House Captains. Stella Maris College now has eight houses, each named after women who have made a significant contribution to the College or to Australian society in general:

Notable alumni

 Marian Baird AO, Sydney University Professor of Gender & Employment Relations 
 Krystal Barter, founder of Pink Hope charity
 Dr Michelle Crockett OAM, awarded for services to medicine
 Katherine Edney, artist, Archibald Prize finalist
 Kiri English-Hawke, author and Olympic rower
 Bronte Halligan, Olympic water polo
 Nancye Hayes AM, musical theatre, stage and screen actress, singer, dancer, choreographer and director
 Kym Wilson, actress and television presenter

See also 

 List of Catholic schools in New South Wales
 Catholic education in Australia

References

External links
 Stella Maris College official website

Girls' schools in New South Wales
Catholic secondary schools in Sydney
Educational institutions established in 1931
1931 establishments in Australia
Manly, New South Wales
Private schools Northern Beaches Sydney
Association of Heads of Independent Girls' Schools
Alliance of Girls' Schools Australasia